Salonia Matidia (4 July 68 – 23 December 119) was the daughter and only child of Ulpia Marciana and wealthy praetor Gaius Salonius Matidius Patruinus. Her maternal uncle was the Roman emperor Trajan. Trajan had no children and treated her like his daughter. Her father died in 78 and Matidia went with her mother to live with Trajan and his wife, Pompeia Plotina.

Life
Between 81 and 82, Matidia married a suffect consul and former proconsul Lucius Vibius Sabinus. Sabinus died in 83 or 84. Matidia bore Sabinus a daughter called Vibia Sabina, who would marry the future Roman Emperor Hadrian. Matidia was very fond of her second cousin Hadrian and allowed him to marry Vibia Sabina.

In 84, Matidia married for a second time to an otherwise unknown Roman aristocrat called Lucius Mindius. Matidia bore Mindius a daughter called Mindia Matidia, commonly known as Matidia Minor. Mindius died in 85.

Matidia later married Lucius Scribonius Libo Rupilius Frugi Bonus, who was suffect consul in 88. Frugi had a daughter called Rupilia Faustina from an earlier marriage. Faustina would go on to marry the Roman Senator Marcus Annius Verus, to whom she bore one daughter and two sons.

Matidia often traveled with her uncle and assisted him with decision-making. Like her mother, Matidia was honored with monuments and inscriptions in her name throughout the Roman Empire. On 29 August 112, she received the title of Augusta upon the death and divinization of Marciana.

When Trajan died in 117, Matidia and Plotina brought the emperor's ashes back to Rome. In 119 Matidia died, whereupon the Roman Emperor Hadrian delivered her funeral oration, deified her, and granted her a temple and altar in Rome itself. She thus became the first divinized Roman woman to be dedicated a full-scale temple of her own, as opposed to one shared with her husband or a smaller shrine.

References

External links

68 births
119 deaths
1st-century Roman women
2nd-century Roman women
Deified Roman women
Nerva–Antonine dynasty
Augustae